Tasty n Sons was a restaurant in Portland, Oregon's Boise neighborhood, in the United States. The restaurant was named Willamette Week Restaurant of the Year in 2010, and one of the city's best restaurants by The Oregonian in 2016. The North Williams restaurant closed on January 20, 2019, and was relocated and reopened as Tasty n Daughters, in the space currently occupied by The Woodsman Tavern, in February 2019.

Tasty n Sons' sister restaurant, Tasty n Alder, is located in downtown Portland.

See also

 List of defunct restaurants of the United States

References

External links
 

2019 disestablishments in Oregon
Boise, Portland, Oregon
Defunct restaurants in Portland, Oregon
North Portland, Oregon
Restaurants disestablished in 2019